Aaradhika is a 1973 Indian Malayalam film, directed by B. K. Pottekkad and produced by G. P. Balan. The film stars Jayabharathi, Raghavan, Rani Chandra and Vincent in the lead roles. The film had musical score by M. S. Baburaj.

Cast

Jayabharathi as Hema
Raghavan as Hari
Rani Chandra as Latha
Vincent as Jayan
Adoor Bhasi as Settu
Sreelatha Namboothiri as Lucy
Nilambur Balan as Prem
Paul Vengola as Paul
Philomina as Hostel Warden
Vijayan (Old)
Lathika (Old)

Soundtrack
The music was composed by M. S. Baburaj and the lyrics were written by Sreekumaran Thampi.

References

External links
 

1973 films
1970s Malayalam-language films